Samson Iyede Onomigho (born 28 January 1998) is a Nigerian footballer currently playing as a forward for AC Horsens in Denmark, who bought him on June 7th 2022 from FC Fredericia.

Career statistics

Club
.

Notes

References

1998 births
Living people
Nigerian footballers
Nigerian expatriate footballers
Association football forwards
Danish 1st Division players
Challenger Pro League players
F.C. Ebedei players
FC Midtjylland players
Paide Linnameeskond players
Fremad Amager players
Lommel S.K. players
FC Fredericia players
AC Horsens players
Nigerian expatriate sportspeople in Denmark
Nigerian expatriate sportspeople in Belgium
Expatriate men's footballers in Denmark
Expatriate footballers in Belgium